Bunning is a surname. Notable people with the surname include:

David Bunning (b. 1966), federal judge for the United States District Court for the Eastern District of Kentucky
Erwin Bünning (1906–1990), German biologist
James Bunstone Bunning (1802–1863), British architect
Jim Bunning (1931–2017), former US Senator from Kentucky, and former Major League Baseball pitcher
Walter Bunning (1912–1977), Australian architect

See also
Bunnings Warehouse